The 14th Street Crosstown Line is a public transit line in Manhattan, New York City, running primarily along 14th Street from Chelsea or the West Village to the Lower East Side. Originally a streetcar line, it is now the M14 bus route, operated by the New York City Transit Authority. The line's two variants, the M14A SBS and M14D SBS, use Avenue A and Avenue D respectively from 14th Street south into the Lower East Side.

Route description and service
Both M14 services share the 14th Street Crosstown corridor between 9th Avenue on the West Side and Avenue A on the Lower East Side. The "A" and "D" designations refer to the north–south streets used by each service within the Lower East Side (Avenue A and Avenue D respectively).

West of 9th Avenue, the M14A SBS turns south along Hudson Street, terminating at Bleecker Street at Abingdon Square Park. The M14D SBS meanwhile, travels north to Chelsea Piers, serving Hudson River Park and the Chelsea Market. Until Select Bus Service was implemented, the M14A SBS followed this route during the overnight hours. This was changed to operate to Abingdon Square at all times. At the east end of the corridor, the M14A SBS turns south at Avenue A (which becomes Essex Street south of Houston Street), then east along Grand Street to the FDR Drive on the East River coastline. The M14D SBS travels along Avenue C, East 10th Street, then south along Avenue D (becoming Columbia Street) to Delancey Street at the Baruch Houses.

During weekday rush hours, some M14 SBS buses make short turn runs, resulting in some westbound M14 buses terminating at either Union Square or Eighth Avenue, and some eastbound M14 buses to terminate at First Avenue. These trips may be signed as just the M14, without any letter suffix.

The M14A/D SBS routes supplement the 14th Street Line, which runs from Eighth Avenue and continues into Brooklyn.

Stops

History
The tracks were built by several companies and pieced together by the Metropolitan Street Railway by 1899. The Bleecker Street and Fulton Ferry Railroad built the 14th Street tracks west of 9th Avenue, the Central Crosstown Railroad built from 9th Avenue to Union Square, and the Forty-Second Street and Grand Street Ferry Railroad built from Union Square to Avenue A and south on Avenue A. The Metropolitan Crosstown built a short connection at Union Square to connect the two halves, and  tracks north on 11th Avenue to the West 23rd Street Ferry.

When the Williamsburg Bridge opened in 1904, 14th Street cars were rerouted to use the bridge (running east on Delancey Street from the one-way pair of Clinton Street northbound and Essex Street southbound), running as the 14th Street-Williamsburg Bridge Line until 1911. Buses were substituted for streetcars by the New York City Omnibus Corporation on April 20, 1936.

Avenue D service was added on January 28, 1951, initially running from Broadway along 14th Street, Avenue D and Columbia Street to Stanton Street, and returning on Cannon Street and Houston Street.

That company changed its name to Fifth Avenue Coach Lines in 1956; the Manhattan and Bronx Surface Transit Operating Authority (MaBSTOA) subsidiary of the New York City Transit Authority took over operations in 1962.

The route was once operated by the now defunct Hudson Pier Depot and was known only as the M14. When the depot was taken over by the Quill depot, it was separated into three lines, the M14A, M14C and M14D. After the 9/11 attacks, the block of 14th Street between Avenue C and Avenue D was closed to the public, forcing the M14D to run the M14C route, eventually it was decided since the route ran primarily on Avenue D the route would be renamed M14D. From 2004 to 2006, the M14C briefly returned running down Avenue C to Houston Street then turning East towards Avenue D/Columbia Street and resuming the normal route. This new route began running late and caused confusion with the M21 on Avenue C and eventually service returned to its current state as the M14A and M14D. Afterward, Avenue C was temporarily served by the M21 bus, but since 2010, it has been served by the M9 bus.

Select Bus Service

In April 2019, a Select Bus Service line was planned to run along 14th Street to provide alternate service during the original L train shutdown plan. Service was expected to operate from Ninth Avenue to Avenue C, then turn north along Avenue C to 20th Street, where there would be a ferry transfer. This route was to be another branch supplementing the existing M14A/D designation, but the existing lines would not be converted to Select Bus Service. To facilitate bus trips on the M14 corridor, the 14th Street busway would be implemented, turning parts of 14th Street into a bus-only street during rush hours. The Select Bus Service route was to be implemented by January 6, 2019, three months before the tunnel was set to shut down. It was to initially run with five stops in each direction between First Avenue/14th Street and 10th Avenue/14th Street. Local service on the M14A and M14D would be retained with minor modifications. One or two weeks before the tunnel would originally close, the M14 SBS was to be extended to Stuyvesant Cove. The M14A/D local and the M14 SBS would be able to serve a combined 84,000 passengers every hour, with a bus every two minutes during rush hours. During late night hours, the M14 SBS would be replaced by the  route to the Bedford Avenue station in Brooklyn. After the 14th Street Tunnel work was completed, some version of M14 SBS service would continue operating.

On January 4, 2019, Governor Andrew Cuomo announced that the L train shutdown would be modified. An alternate plan of weekend and late-night construction would be executed instead, therefore putting the initial M14 SBS plan in limbo. New York City Transit later announced that it still planned to implement SBS along the corridor, and continued to work with the DOT on a plan for permanent service. The preliminary plan was to convert both the M14A and M14D routes into SBS routes. On March 6, 2019, the NYCDOT met with elected officials and revealed plans to implement Select Bus Service on both the M14A and the M14D in June 2019, with an accelerated timeline to provide an alternative to L service. The implementation of bus lanes on the branches in the Lower East Side was to be implemented later on. Bus stops on each branch would be spaced out to speed up service. The M14A's terminal loop through Abingdon Square was to be implemented on a 9-month trial due to difficulty of bus operations there, as well as complaints of buses laying over in the Abingdon Square area. If the terminal was eliminated during or after the trial, service would be extended to Tenth Avenue. As of May 2022, the M14A continues to serve Abingdon Square at all times. Bus lanes would either make use of the busway layout intended for the Tunnel shutdown or would consist of standard bus lanes.

In April 2019, the busway was added back to the plan. SBS was later pushed back to July 1, 2019. However, due to a lawsuit, the busway was not implemented as scheduled, and after another delay that August, went into effect on October 3, 2019. The busway was so successful on its first day that M14 buses had to be slowed down in order to keep from running ahead of their posted schedules. In December 2019, the M14A/D SBS were the launch routes for the MTA's new battery-electric New Flyer Xcelsior XE60 buses.

References

External links

 
 Select Bus Service − mta.info
 M14 SBS: Keeping Buses Moving on 14 St and the Lower East Side − mta.info
 14th Street Select Bus Service with Transit & Truck Priority Pilot Project − NYCDOT

Crosstown 014
Railway lines opened in 1899
1899 establishments in New York City
M014
014
14th Street (Manhattan)